Devaun "Sammy" DeGraff (born December 25, 1980) is a retired Bermudian football player.

Club career
DeGraff played the majority of his career with local side North Village Rams, and played for the team for one year in the Bermudian Premier Division before joining the Bermuda Hogges in the USL Second Division in 2007. He was mostly used as a holding or attacking midfielder at the Villagers. He also played in Texas for Dallas Lightning.

He announced his retirement in August 2012.

International career
He made his debut for Bermuda in a September 2006 Caribbean Cup qualification match against the US Virgin Islands and earned a total of 14 caps, scoring 3 goals. He has represented his country in 7 FIFA World Cup qualification matches. He played in two of Bermuda's qualifying games for the 2010 FIFA World Cup, including their 3–1 victory over the Cayman Islands on March 30, 2008.

His final international match was a November 2011 World Cup qualification match against Barbados.

International goals
Scores and results list Bermuda's goal tally first.

Personal life

DeGraff returned to Bermuda in 2006 to become a music teacher at Whitney Institute. He plays the saxophone himself.

Seventh-Day Adventist
DeGraff missed a World Cup qualification match against Trinidad and Tobago in 2011 because it was played on a Friday night, which did not met his beliefs as a Seventh-Day Adventist. In March 2013, he co-hosted a show on the local Seventh Day Adventist television station, Channel 80.

References

External links

1980 births
Living people
Association football midfielders
Bermudian footballers
Bermuda international footballers
North Village Rams players
Bermuda Hogges F.C. players
USL Second Division players
Bermudian Seventh-day Adventists